Jalpari or Jal Pari may refer to:

 Jal Pari (album), a 2004 album by Atif Aslam
 Jal Pari (TV series), a TV serial aired on Geo TV, Pakistan
 Jalpari (1952 film), a 1952 Bollywood film featuring Nalini Jaywant
 Jalpari: The Desert Mermaid, a 2012 Indian film